The Beach Boys recorded a myriad of songs, instrumentals, and alternate versions of tracks that have never been officially released. Only recordings that have been reliably confirmed to have existed are listed here. Some of these tracks circulate on bootlegs, but many of the tapes have been lost since their creation.

This list is ordered chronologically, by recording date, and does not include non-substantial rehearsal tapes or jam sessions recorded by the group. Live recordings are included if there is no studio equivalent. Some tracks listed under certain album subheaders may not have been recorded for that particular album, but are listed as such simply to note the band's then-current album project at the time of recording.

Key

1962–1968

Surfin' Safari – Party! (1962–1965)

Pet Sounds – 20/20 (1965–1968)

1969–1972

Sunflower – Surf's Up (1969–1971)

"So Tough" – Holland (1971–1972)

1973–1975

1976–1977

15 Big Ones – Love You (1976)

Adult/Child (1977)

1977–1980

M.I.U. Album – L.A. (Light Album) (1977–1979)

Keepin' the Summer Alive (1979–1980)

Later recordings

1980s–1990s

That's Why God Made the Radio (2011–2012)

A total of 28 songs were written and recorded for the album. Discounting the 2011 rerecording of "Do It Again", only twelve tracks saw release.

Formerly unreleased songs
For historical interest, the following is a list of studio outtakes and live recordings that later appeared on Beach Boys compilation albums. It is partially adapted from Andrew Doe and Phillip Lambert.

References
Citations

Bibliography

 

 

 
 
Beach Boys
Beach Boys